PTV News Tonight is the flagship English late-night news program of PTV, which was aired from September 7, 2020, through the network's new studio to present, replacing PTV News Headlines. airing weeknights from 9:30 to 10:30 PM PST.

History
PTV News Tonight started airing as a daily nightly news program replacing PTV News Headlines,  as part of programming changes in the network's news division. Originally slated for launch by August 3, 2020, the planned launch was suspended due to coronavirus infections in the PTV main office. This left the network airing hourly newsbreak PTV Balita Ngayon and the 6pm bulletin PTV News until disinfection operations and personnel recovery happened in September.

The launch pushed through eventually on September 7, with News Headlines anchors Joee Guilas and Charms Espina retained in the lineup while former PTV News anchor Catherine Vital will join Guilas and Espina on March 3, 2021. It joined Ulat Bayan, the new morning show Rise and Shine Pilipinas, afternoon newscast Sentro Balita and PTV Balita Ngayon in transferring to a revamped Studio B, while updating it's graphics, theme music, and title card, leaving PTV Studio A for use of the network's other programs including its public service program Public Briefing: #LagingHandaPH and Digong 8888 Hotline. The newscast also debuted new segments including a pop culture and trends section anchored by Rise and Shine Pilipinas host Gab Bayan, as well as PCSO Lottery Draw report straight from the PCSO's draw studio in Mandaluyong.

Anchors
Current
 Joee Guilas 
 Charms Espina 
 Monique Tuzon

Former anchors
 Catherine Vital

Segment anchors
 Gab Bayan 
 Champ de Lunas

Segments
Current
Market Trends (since 2020)
Malacañan (2020-2021, 2021, 2022)
World of Business (since 2021)
PCSO Lottery Draw Update (since 2020)
PTV InfoWeather (since 2020)
The Nation (since 2020)
War on Drugs (since 2020)
The Countryside (2020-2021, 2021, 2022)
ASEAN News (since 2020)
The World (since 2020)
PTV Sports (since 2020)
Biz 101 (since 2022)
Food for Thought (since 2020)
Former
Rush Hour (2020-2021)
FactBox (2020-2022)
Pop Culture Corner (2020-2021)
Meet the Millennials (2020-2021)

Reporters
National correspondents and beats
 Alvin Barcelona (from Inquirer 990 Television - General Assignments)
 Bea Bernardo (AFP/PNP)
 Elizabeth Cachin (PTV Senior Correspondent - ASEAN News)
 Louisa Erispe (General Assignments)
 Mark Fetalco (City of Manila)
 Allan Francisco (from DWIZ PTV Senior Correspondent - City of Manila)
 Dexter Ganibe (from TeleRadyo - General Assignments)
 Joshua Garcia (from Golden Nation Network - General Assignments)
 Gillian Geronimo (from Golden Nation Network - General Assignments)
 Deo De Guzman (from RMN 558 Manila - General Assignments)
 Catleya Jardenil-Antonio (General Assignments)
 Bernard Jaudian Jr. (Police Beat)
 Patrick De Jesus (General Assignments/NCRPO)
 Mica Ella Joson (Southern Metro/MMDA)
 Rod Lagusad (from Inquirer 990 Television - General Assignments)
 Ryan Lesigues (from 104.7 Brigada News FM National - General Assignments)
 Mela Lesmoras (Malacañang)
 Mary Grace Luna (General Assignments)
 Maan Macapagal (from ABS-CBN - General Assignments)
 Den Macaranas (from Inquirer 990 Television - General Assignments)
 Daniel Manalastas (from News Light - House of Representatives)
 Kenneth Paciente (PTV Senior Correspondent - Judiciary) 
 Cleizl Pardilla (Quezon City) 
 Sandra Samala (General Assignments)
 Eunice Samonte (PTV Senior Correspondent - Senate)
 Stephanie Sevillano (General Assignments) 
 Noel Talacay (from RMN 558 Manila - General Assignments)
 Naomi Tiburcio (General Assignments/Foreign Affairs)
 Sweeden Velado-Ramirez (PTV Senior Correspondent)
 Karen Villanda (from  CLTV 36 - General Assignments)
 Cecille Villarosa (from DZBB - General Assignments)

Regional and international correspondents
 Vina Araneta-Pilapil (PTV Davao)
 John Aroa (PTV Cebu)
 Glory Balegan (PTV Cordillera)
 Breves Bulsao (PTV Cordillera)
 Jorton Campana (PTV Cordillera)
 Eddie Carta (PTV Cordillera)
 Rachelle Garcia (PTV Cordillera)
 Debbie Gasingan (PTV Cordillera)
 Danielle Grace De Guzman (PTV Cordillera)
 Regine Lanuza (PTV Davao)
 Jay Lagang (PTV Davao)
 Hughie Lenis (PTV Cebu)
 Clodet Loreto (PTV Davao)
 Jai Mondez (PTV Davao)
 Julius Pacot (PTV Davao)
 Florence Paytocan (PTV Cordillera)
 Rodirey Salas (PTV Davao)
 Hannah Salcedo (PTV Davao)
 Alah Sungduan (PTV Cordillera)
 Fevi Kate Valdez (PTV Cordillera)
 Dick Villanueva (PTV France News Stringer)

See also
 List of programs broadcast by People's Television Network
 PTV Sports
 PNA Newsroom

References 

Philippine television news shows
People's Television Network original programming
English-language television shows
2020 Philippine television series debuts
2020s Philippine television series